Sahibzada Farooq Anwar Abbasi was a Pakistani politician who was member of the Provincial Assembly of the Punjab, National Assembly of Pakistan and of the royal family of Bahawalpur State. He died in 2013.

References

2013 deaths
Bahawalpur royal family
Pakistani MNAs 1990–1993
Year of birth missing
Date of death missing